Rebel Girl may refer to:
 "Rebel Girl" (Bikini Kill song), 1993 
 "Rebel Girl" (Angels & Airwaves song), 2019
 "The Rebel Girl", a 1911 song by Joe Hill, written for Elizabeth Gurley Flynn
 Elizabeth Gurley Flynn (1890–1964), labor leader, activist, and feminist
 Rebel Girl, an EP by Endless Shame
 Rebel Girls, the children's book publisher and media company